Paul Johns was chair of the Campaign for Nuclear Disarmament (CND) between 1985 and 1987.

Johns worked previously as a management consultant for different companies, both large and small. In the 1980s he was active in the peace movement, first becoming Chair of Christian CND and then, for two years, of CND as a whole. He later became Managing Director of Traidcraft; and followed this with five years part-time work for the FA Premier League, helping to improve communication between clubs and supporters. He is a co-founder of SANA, a small joint Christian-Muslim development agency in Bosnia where he has worked for several weeks a year for over 12 years. He also runs the charity Friends of St Hannah's which supports an orphanage in Baghdad, Iraq.

Johns has in the past been a regular contributor to BBC Radio 4's "Thought for the Day". He writes and tell stories, one book of which, September 11 and beyond, has been published. He also writes plays for performance locally in West Bridgford, Nottinghamshire, where he has lived for most of the last 40 years.

Johns became director of the College of Preachers in September 2006. He is a Methodist local preacher. He has an MA in history at Oxford University and Master of Theology (MTh) degree at the University of Wales.

References

Living people
Campaign for Nuclear Disarmament activists
British anti–nuclear weapons activists
People from West Bridgford
British Methodists
Year of birth missing (living people)